A mental representation (or cognitive representation), in philosophy of mind, cognitive psychology, neuroscience, and cognitive science, is a hypothetical internal cognitive symbol that represents external reality, or else a mental process that makes use of such a symbol:  "a formal system for making explicit certain entities or types of information, together with a specification of how the system does this".

Mental representation is the mental imagery of things that are not actually present to the senses. In contemporary philosophy, specifically in fields of metaphysics such as philosophy of mind and ontology, a mental representation is one of the prevailing ways of explaining and describing the nature of ideas and concepts.

Mental representations (or mental imagery) enable representing things that have never been experienced as well as things that do not exist. Think of yourself traveling to a place you have never visited before, or having a third arm. These things have either never happened or are impossible and do not exist, yet our brain and mental imagery allows us to imagine them. Although visual imagery is more likely to be recalled, mental imagery may involve representations in any of the sensory modalities, such as hearing, smell, or taste. Stephen Kosslyn proposes that images are used to help solve certain types of problems. We are able to visualize the objects in question and mentally represent the images to solve it.

Mental representations also allow people to experience things right in front of them—however, the process of how the brain interprets and stores the representational content is debated.

Representational theories of mind 

Representationalism (also known as indirect realism) is the view that representations are the main way we access external reality.

The representational theory of mind attempts to explain the nature of ideas, concepts and other mental content in contemporary philosophy of mind, cognitive science and experimental psychology. In contrast to theories of naïve or direct realism, the representational theory of mind postulates the actual existence of mental representations which act as intermediaries between the observing subject and the objects, processes or other entities observed in the external world. These intermediaries stand for or represent to the mind the objects of that world.

For example, when someone arrives at the belief that their floor needs sweeping, the representational theory of mind states that they form a mental representation that represents the floor and its state of cleanliness.

The original or "classical" representational theory probably can be traced back to Thomas Hobbes and was a dominant theme in classical empiricism in general. According to this version of the theory, the mental representations were images (often called "ideas") of the objects or states of affairs represented. For modern adherents, such as Jerry Fodor, Steven Pinker and many others, the representational system consists rather of an internal language of thought (i.e., mentalese). The contents of thoughts are represented in symbolic structures (the formulas of Mentalese) which, analogously to natural languages but on a much more abstract level, possess a syntax and semantics very much like those of natural languages. For the Portuguese logician and cognitive scientist Luis M. Augusto, at this abstract, formal level, the syntax of thought is the set of symbol rules (i.e., operations, processes, etc. on and with symbol structures) and the semantics of thought is the set of symbol structures (concepts and propositions). Content (i.e., thought) emerges from the meaningful co-occurrence of both sets of symbols. For instance, "8 x 9" is a meaningful co-occurrence, whereas "CAT x §" is not; "x" is a symbol rule called for by symbol structures such as "8" and "9", but not by "CAT" and "§".

Canadian philosopher P. Thagard noted in his work “Introduction to Cognitive Science”, that “most cognitive scientists agree that knowledge in the human mind consists of mental representations” and that “cognitive science asserts: that people have mental procedures that operate by means of mental representations for the implementation of thinking and action"

Strong vs weak, restricted vs unrestricted 
There are two types of representationalism, strong and weak. Strong representationalism attempts to reduce phenomenal character to intentional content. On the other hand, weak representationalism claims only that phenomenal character supervenes on intentional content. Strong representationalism aims to provide a theory about the nature of phenomenal character, and offers a solution to the hard problem of consciousness. In contrast to this, weak representationalism does not aim to provide a theory of consciousness, nor does it offer a solution to the hard problem of consciousness.

Strong representationalism can be further broken down into restricted and unrestricted versions. The restricted version deals only with certain kinds of phenomenal states e.g. visual perception. Most representationalists endorse an unrestricted version of representationalism. According to the unrestricted version, for any state with phenomenal character that state's phenomenal character reduces to its intentional content. Only this unrestricted version of representationalism is able to provide a general theory about the nature of phenomenal character, as well as offer a potential solution to the hard problem of consciousness. The successful reduction of the phenomenal character of a state to its intentional content would provide a solution to the hard problem of consciousness once a physicalist account of intentionality is worked out.

Problems for the unrestricted version 
When arguing against the unrestricted version of representationalism people will often bring up phenomenal mental states that appear to lack intentional content. The unrestricted version seeks to account for all phenomenal states. Thus, for it to be true, all states with phenomenal character must have intentional content to which that character is reduced. Phenomenal states without intentional content therefore serve as a counterexample to the unrestricted version. If the state has no intentional content its phenomenal character will not be reducible to that state's intentional content, for it has none to begin with.

A common example of this kind of state are moods. Moods are states with phenomenal character that are generally thought to not be directed at anything in particular. Moods are thought to lack directedness, unlike emotions, which are typically thought to be directed at particular things e.g. you are mad at your sibling, you are afraid of a dangerous animal. People conclude that because moods are undirected they are also nonintentional i.e. they lack intentionality or aboutness. Because they are not directed at anything they are not about anything. Because they lack intentionality they will lack any intentional content. Lacking intentional content their phenomenal character will not be reducible to intentional content, refuting the representational doctrine.

Though emotions are typically considered as having directedness and intentionality this idea has also been called into question. One might point to emotions a person all of a sudden experiences that do not appear to be directed at or about anything in particular. Emotions elicited by listening to music are another potential example of undirected, nonintentional emotions. Emotions aroused in this way do not seem to necessarily be about anything, including the music that arouses them.

Responses 
In response to this objection, a proponent of representationalism might reject the undirected non-intentionality of moods, and attempt to identify some intentional content they might plausibly be thought to possess. The proponent of representationalism might also reject the narrow conception of intentionality as being directed at a particular thing, arguing instead for a broader kind of intentionality.

There are three alternative kinds of directedness/intentionality one might posit for moods. 
 Outward directedness: What it is like to be in mood M is to have a certain kind of outwardly focused representational content.
 Inward directedness: What it is like to be in mood M is to have a certain kind of inwardly focused representational content.
 Hybrid directedness: What it is like to be in mood M is to have both a certain kind of outwardly focused representational content and a certain kind of inwardly focused representational content.
In the case of outward directedness, moods might be directed at either the world as a whole, a changing series of objects in the world, or unbound emotion properties projected by people onto things in the world. In the case of inward directedness, moods are directed at the overall state of a person's body. In the case of hybrid, directedness moods are directed at some combination of inward and outward things.

Further objections 
Even if one can identify some possible intentional content for moods we might still question whether that content is able to sufficiently capture the phenomenal character of the mood states they are a part of. Amy Kind contends that in the case of all the previously mentioned kinds of directedness (outward, inward, and hybrid) the intentional content supplied to the mood state is not capable of sufficiently capturing the phenomenal aspects of the mood states. In the case of inward directedness, the phenomenology of the mood does not seem tied to the state of one's body, and even if one's mood is reflected by the overall state of one's body that person will not necessarily be aware of it, demonstrating the insufficiency of the intentional content to adequately capture the phenomenal aspects of the mood. In the case of outward directedness, the phenomenology of the mood and its intentional content does not seem to share the corresponding relation they should given that the phenomenal character is supposed to reduce to the intentional content. Hybrid directedness, if it can even get off the ground, faces the same objection.

Philosophers 
There is a wide debate on what kinds of representations exist. There are several philosophers who bring about different aspects of the debate. Such philosophers include Alex Morgan, Gualtiero Piccinini, Uriah Kriegel and others.

Alex Morgan 

There are "job description" representations. That is representations that (1) represent something—have intentionality, (2) have a special relation—the represented object does not need to exist, and (3) content plays a causal role in what gets represented:  e.g. saying "hello" to a friend, giving a glare to an enemy.

Structural representations are also important. These types of representations are basically mental maps that we have in our minds that correspond exactly to those objects in the world (the intentional content). According to Morgan, structural representations are not the same as mental representations—there is nothing mental about them:  plants can have structural representations.

There are also internal representations. These types of representations include those that involve future decisions, episodic memories, or any type of projection into the future.

Gualtiero Piccinini 

In Gualtiero Piccinini's forthcoming work, he discusses topics on natural and nonnatural mental representations. He relies on the natural definition of mental representations given by Grice (1957) where P entails that P. e.g. Those spots mean measles, entails that the patient has measles. Then there are nonnatural representations:  P does not entail P. e.g. The 3 rings on the bell of a bus mean the bus is full—the rings on the bell are independent of the fullness of the bus—we could have assigned something else (just as arbitrary) to signify that the bus is full.

Uriah Kriegel 

There are also objective and subjective mental representations. Objective representations are closest to tracking theories—where the brain simply tracks what is in the environment. If there is a blue bird outside my window, the objective representation is that of the blue bird. Subjective representations can vary person-to-person. For example, if I am colorblind, that blue bird outside my window will not appear blue to me since I cannot represent the blueness of blue (i.e. I cannot see the color blue). The relationship between these two types of representation can vary.

Objective varies, but the subjective does not:  e.g. brain-in-a-vat
Subjective varies, but the objective does not:  e.g. color-inverted world
All representations found in objective and none in the subjective:  e.g. thermometer
All representations found in subjective and none in the objective:  e.g. an agent that experiences in a void.

Eliminativists think that subjective representations don't exist. Reductivists think subjective representations are reducible to objective. Non-reductivists think that subjective representations are real and distinct.

See also

References

Further reading
 Augusto, Luis M. (2013). 'Unconscious Representations 1:  Belying the Traditional Model of Human Cognition.' Axiomathes 23.4,  645–663. Preprint
 Goldman, Alvin I (2014). 'The Bodily Formats Approach to Embodied Cognition.' Current Controversies in Philosophy of Mind. ed. Uriah Kriegel. New York, NY:  Routledge, 91-108.
 Henrich, J. & Boyd, R. (2002). Culture and cognition: Why cultural evolution does not require replication of representations. Culture and Cognition, 2, 87–112. Full text
 Kind, Amy (2014). 'The Case against Representationalism about Moods.' Current Controversies in Philosophy of Mind. ed. Uriah Kriegel. New York, NY:  Routledge, 113–34. 
 Kriegel, Uriah (2014). 'Two Notions of Mental Representation.' Current Controversies in Philosophy of Mind. ed. Uriah Kriegel. New York, NY:  Routledge, 161–79.
 Rupert, Robert D.(2014). 'The Sufficiency of Objective Representation.' Current Controversies in Philosophy of Mind. ed. Uriah Kriegel. New York, NY:  Routledge, 180–95. 
 Shapiro, Lawrence (2014). 'When Is Cognition Embodied.' Current Controversies in Philosophy of Mind. ed. Uriah Kriegel. New York, NY:  Routledge, 73–90.

External links
 Stanford Encyclopedia of Philosophy: Mental Representation

Cognitive modeling
Cognitive psychology
Cognitive science
Concepts in metaphysics
Conceptualism
Analytic philosophy
Imagination
Metaphysics of mind
Ontology
Perception
Philosophy of mind
Theory of mind